Hugunin is a surname. Notable people with the surname include:

Daniel Hugunin Jr. (1790–1850), American politician
Jim Hugunin, software programmer